Tenzin Samdup (born 23 December 1992) is a professional footballer who plays as a goalkeeper for Mumbai Kenkre in the I-League. Born in India, he represents the Tibet national team in CONIFA tournaments.

Earlier career
Samdup began his professional career with Indian club Doeguling Youth Sports Association (DYSA), with which he won the 2008 GCM football cup in Gangtok. He later appeared with Goa-Tibetan, TNFA All-Stars club and Sikkim Akraman.

Club career

Earlier career
Before signing for Chennai City in the Indian top flight, upon some unsuccessful trials with various teams, he worked as an English teacher for monks.

In 2018, he signed for Chennai City FC in the Indian I-League, where he made one league appearance before joining Real Kashmir. On 9 March 2019, Chennai City beat former champions Minerva Punjab FC 3–1 to be crowned the 2018–19 I-League champions. With Real Kashmir, he played in 2019–20 I-League season.

Mumbai Kenkre 
On 1 September 2021, Tenzin signed for Mumbai Kenkre ahead of the I-League Qualifiers. Though the team missed out on promotion to the I-League, they eventually replaced Chennai City after they failed to comply with club licensing regulations.

On 4 March 2022, he made his first appearance in the I-League for the club, against his former club Real Kashmir, in a 1–1 draw. He was awarded the Hero of the Match for his outstanding display against Rajasthan United, on 25 March 2022, in 0–0 stalemate. The club finished in bottom after the phrase-1 and placed in relegation stage, achieved only 12 points and relegated to the 2022–23 I-League 2nd Division. Later in September, Kenkre was reinstated on sympathetic grounds by the AIFF and allowed to participate in the 2022–23 I-League season. They later went on to participate in Baji Raut Cup in Odisha, in which they reached semi-finals.

International career
Samdup is a regular member of the Tibet national football team, a Non-FIFA international football team that represents Tibet. He appeared with Tibet at the 2018 CONIFA World Football Cup, one of few tournaments the team has ever competed in.

Career statistics

Club

Honours
Doeguling Youth SA
GCM Football Cup: 2018

Chennai City
I-League: 2018–19

Kenkre
I-League 2nd Division runner-up: 2021

Individual
Sikkim Gold Cup Best Goalkeeper: 2017

See also
List of Tibetan footballers

References

External links
 
 
 Tenzin Samdup at PlaymakerStats
 Tenzin Samdup at AIFF

Indian footballers
Tibetan footballers
Tibet international footballers
Living people
Association football goalkeepers
1992 births
Footballers from Pune
Indian people of Tibetan descent
Chennai City FC players
Real Kashmir FC players
I-League players